Metasia parallelalis is a moth in the family Crambidae, found in Niger.  It was described by Rothschild in 1921.

References

Moths described in 1921
Metasia